Seychelles competed at the 2016 Summer Olympics in Rio de Janeiro, Brazil, from 5 to 21 August 2016. This was the nation's eighth appearance at the Summer Olympics, with the exception of the 1988 Summer Olympics in Seoul because of its partial support to the North Korean boycott.

The Seychelles Olympic and Commonwealth Games Association (SOCGA) sent the nation's largest delegation to the Games since 1992. A total of ten athletes, eight men and two women, were selected to the Seychellois squad across six sports (athletics, boxing, judo, sailing, swimming, and weightlifting).

Finn yachtsman Allan Julie etching his name into the history records as the oldest participant (aged 39) of the Seychellois squad and the first to compete in five Olympic Games. Apart from Julie, three other athletes were returning Olympians; all of them participated in their second Games, including high jumper Lissa Labiche, lightweight boxer Andrique Allisop, and half-heavyweight judoka Dominic Dugasse (men's 100 kg). Six Seychellois athletes made their Olympic debut in Rio de Janeiro, with Laser sailor Rodney Govinden acting as the nation's flag bearer in the opening ceremony. The Seychelles, however, has yet to win its first Olympic medal.

Athletics
 
Seychelles received universality slots from IAAF to send two athletes (one male and one female) to the Olympics.

Track & road events

Field events

Boxing

Seychelles entered one boxer who competed in the men's lightweight division into the Olympic boxing tournament. 2012 Olympian Andrique Allisop had claimed his Olympic spot with a box-off victory at the 2016 African Qualification Tournament in Yaoundé, Cameroon.

Judo

Seychelles qualified one judoka for the men's half-heavyweight category (100 kg) at the Games. London 2012 Olympian Dominic Dugasse earned a continental quota spot from the African region, as Seychelles' top-ranked judoka outside of direct qualifying position in the IJF World Ranking List of May 30, 2016.

Sailing

Seychellois sailors qualified one boat in each of the following classes through the individual fleet World Championships, and African qualifying regattas.

M = Medal race; EL = Eliminated – did not advance into the medal race

Swimming

Seychelles received a Universality invitation from FINA to send two swimmers (one male and one female) to the Olympics.

Weightlifting

Seychelles received an invitation from the Tripartite Commission to send Rick Confiance in the men's featherweight category (62 kg) to the Olympics, which signified the nation's Olympic return to the sport after an eight-year hiatus.

References

External links 
 

Nations at the 2016 Summer Olympics
2016
Olympics